Kultura i zhizn (Russian: Culture and Life) was a cultural magazine which was published in the period 1946–1951 in Moscow, Soviet Union. It was one of the publications of the central committee of the Communist Party.

History and profile
Kultura i zhizn was first published on 28 June 1946. It was started by the propaganda institution of the central committee of the Communist Party, Administration of Agitation and Propaganda, abbreviated as Agitprop. Soon after its start the magazine became the principal media outlet for the ideologists of the party. The goals of Kultura i zhizn were reported as follows: "to develop Bolshevist criticism of defects in different branches of the economy and cultural life and to carry on an unyielding struggle with the remnants of the old ideology and with laziness, lack of culture, bureaucracy and carelessness... Producers and writers who suppose that the Soviet people want only entertainment and amusement... are hopelessly wrong. Soviet literature and art must produce works full of passion and deep thought, shot through with ideas of Soviet patriotism."

Kultura i zhizn was launched as a biweekly publication, but later it was published three times per month. Its headquarters was in Moscow. The founding editor-in-chief of Kultura i zhizn was Andrei Zhdanov who was succeeded by his deputy editor P. A. Satyukov. Lev Kopelev was among its contributors. The magazine frequently reported the activities of the Academy of Social Sciences which was also established by the central committee in 1946.

The last issue of Kultura i zhizn appeared on 28 February 1951.

References

External links

1946 establishments in the Soviet Union
1951 disestablishments in the Soviet Union
Biweekly magazines
Communist magazines
Defunct political magazines
Former state media
Magazines published in the Soviet Union
Magazines established in 1946
Magazines disestablished in 1951
Magazines published in Moscow
Russian-language magazines
Propaganda newspapers and magazines